Johan Budi Sapto Pribowo (born 29 January 1967) is an Indonesian spokesman and journalist. Johan Budi is the Special Assistant to President Joko Widodo on Communication and Media, a.k.a. the Presidential Spokesman. In 2015, he was the Acting Chief of the Corruption Eradication Commission (KPK) to fill in for Abraham Samad and Bambang Widjojanto who were being suspended by President Joko Widodo. 

In July 2018, he became a cadre of Indonesian Democratic Party of Struggle.

Early life
He was born in the Mojokerto.

Career 
Between 2006 and 2014 Johan Budi was the spokesman for the Corruption Eradication Commission (KPK). Previously he served as KPK's Director of Education and Community Services.

References 

1967 births
Living people
People from Mojokerto
Indonesian journalists